Aaron Jones (1881–1954) was an English professional footballer who made 59 appearances in the Football League playing for Barnsley, Birmingham and Notts County. He played as a forward.

Jones was born in Walsall, Staffordshire. His scoring rate of a goal every other game for Barnsley, his first professional club, prompted First Division club Birmingham to pay £170 for his services in May 1905. However, he found himself unable to dislodge the established forwards, Billy Jones, Benny Green and Arthur Mounteney, and played only five games before moving on to fellow First Division club Notts County. Jones scored six goals in 22 league games for County, his last Football League club.

Jones died in Yorkshire in 1954.

References

1881 births
1954 deaths
Sportspeople from Walsall
English footballers
Association football forwards
Barnsley F.C. players
Birmingham City F.C. players
Notts County F.C. players
English Football League players
Date of birth missing
Date of death missing